P.C. Unnichekkan is a communist politician from Kerala, India. He is the Kerala State Secretary of the Communist Party of India (Marxist-Leninist) Red Flag.

References

Indian communists
Living people
Year of birth missing (living people)
Communist Party of India (Marxist–Leninist) politicians